Cytochrome P450 2D6 (CYP2D6) is an enzyme that in humans is encoded by the CYP2D6 gene. CYP2D6 is primarily expressed in the liver. It is also highly expressed in areas of the central nervous system, including the substantia nigra.

CYP2D6, a member of the cytochrome P450 mixed-function oxidase system, is one of the most important enzymes involved in the metabolism of xenobiotics in the body. In particular, CYP2D6 is responsible for the metabolism and elimination of approximately 25% of clinically used drugs, via the addition or removal of certain functional groups – specifically, hydroxylation, demethylation, and dealkylation.  CYP2D6 also activates some prodrugs. This enzyme also metabolizes several endogenous substances, such as hydroxytryptamines, neurosteroids, and both m-tyramine and p-tyramine which CYP2D6 metabolizes into dopamine in the brain and liver.

Considerable variation exists in the efficiency and amount of CYP2D6 enzyme produced between individuals. Hence, for drugs that are metabolized by CYP2D6 (that is, are CYP2D6 substrates), certain individuals will eliminate these drugs quickly (ultrarapid metabolizers) while others slowly (poor metabolizers).  If a drug is metabolized too quickly, it may decrease the drug's efficacy while if the drug is metabolized too slowly, toxicity may result.  So, the dose of the drug may have to be adjusted to take into account of the speed at which it is metabolized by CYP2D6.

Other drugs may function as inhibitors of CYP2D6 activity or inducers of CYP2D6 enzyme expression that will lead to decreased or increased CYP2D6 activity respectively.  If such a drug is taken at the same time as a second drug that is a CYP2D6 substrate, the first drug may affect the elimination rate of the second through what is known as a drug-drug interaction.

Gene 

The gene is located on chromosome 22q13.1. near two cytochrome P450 pseudogenes (CYP2D7P and CYP2D8P). Among them, CYP2D7P originated from CYP2D6 in a stem lineage of great apes and humans, the CYP2D8P originated from CYP2D6 in a stem lineage of Catarrhine and New World monkeys' stem lineage. Alternatively spliced transcript variants encoding different isoforms have been found for this gene.

Genotype/phenotype variability 

CYP2D6 shows the largest phenotypical variability among the CYPs, largely due to genetic polymorphism. The genotype accounts for normal, reduced, and non-existent CYP2D6 function in subjects. Pharmacogenomic tests are now available to identify patients with variations in the CYP2D6 allele and have been shown to have widespread use in clinical practice.
The CYP2D6 function in any particular subject may be described as one of the following:
 poor metabolizer – little or no CYP2D6 function
 intermediate metabolizers – metabolize drugs at a rate somewhere between the poor and extensive metabolizers
 extensive metabolizer – normal CYP2D6 function
 ultrarapid metabolizer – multiple copies of the CYP2D6 gene are expressed, so greater-than-normal CYP2D6 function occurs

A patient's CYP2D6 phenotype is often clinically determined via the administration of debrisoquine (a selective CYP2D6 substrate) and subsequent plasma concentration assay of the debrisoquine metabolite (4-hydroxydebrisoquine).

The type of CYP2D6 function of an individual may influence the person's response to different doses of drugs that CYP2D6 metabolizes. The nature of the effect on the drug response depends not only on the type of CYP2D6 function, but also on the extent to which processing of the drug by CYP2D6 results in a chemical that has an effect that is similar, stronger, or weaker than the original drug, or no effect at all. For example, if CYP2D6 converts a drug that has a strong effect into a substance that has a weaker effect, then poor metabolizers (weak CYP2D6 function) will have an exaggerated response to the drug and stronger side-effects; conversely, if CYP2D6 converts a different drug into a substance that has a greater effect than its parent chemical, then ultrarapid metabolizers (strong CYP2D6 function) will have an exaggerated response to the drug and stronger side-effects. Information about how human genetic variation of CYP2D6 affects response to medications can be found in databases such PharmGKB, Clinical Pharmacogenetics Implementation Consortium (CPIC).

Genetic basis of variability 

The genetic basis for CYP2D6-mediated metabolic variability is the CYP2D6 allele, located on chromosome 22. Subjects possessing certain allelic variants will show normal, decreased, or no CYP2D6 function, depending on the allele. Pharmacogenomic tests are now available to identify patients with variations in the CYP2D6 allele and have been shown to have widespread use in clinical practice. The current known alleles of CYP2D6 and their clinical function can be found in databases such as PharmVar.

Ethnic factors in variability 

Ethnicity is a factor in the occurrence of CYP2D6 variability. The lack of the liver cytochrome CYP2D6 enzyme occurs approximately in 7–10% in white populations, and is lower in most other ethnic groups such as Asians and African-Americans at 2% each. The occurrence of CYP2D6 ultrarapid metabolizers appears to be greater among Middle Eastern and North African populations.

Caucasians with European descent predominantly (around 71%) have the functional group of CYP2D6 alleles, while functional alleles represent only around 50% of the allele frequency in populations of Asian descent.

This variability is accounted for by the differences in the prevalence of various CYP2D6 alleles among the populations–approximately 10% of whites are intermediate metabolizers, due to decreased CYP2D6 function, because they appear to have the non-functional CYP2D6*4 allele, while approximately 50% of Asians possess the decreased functioning CYP2D6*10 allele.

Ligands 
Following is a table of selected substrates, inducers and inhibitors of CYP2D6. Where classes of agents are listed, there may be exceptions within the class.

Inhibitors of CYP2D6 can be classified by their potency, such as:
Strong inhibitor being one that causes at least a 5-fold increase in the plasma AUC values of sensitive substrates metabolized through CYP2D6, or more than 80% decrease in clearance thereof.
Moderate inhibitor being one that causes at least a 2-fold increase in the plasma AUC values of sensitive substrates metabolized through CYP2D6, or 50-80% decrease in clearance thereof.
Weak inhibitor being one that causes at least a 1.25-fold but less than 2-fold increase in the plasma AUC values of sensitive substrates metabolized through CYP2D6, or 20-50% decrease in clearance thereof.

Dopamine biosynthesis

References

Further reading

External links 
 Flockhart Lab Cyp2D6 Substrates Page at IUPUI
 PharmGKB: Annotated PGx Gene Information for CYP2D6
 
 

2
EC 1.14.14
Amphetamine